Pollenia grunini is a species of cluster fly in the family Polleniidae.

Distribution
Armenia, Georgia, Russia.

References

Polleniidae
Insects described in 1988
Diptera of Europe